Étienne Lainez (or Lainé, Laînez) (23 May 1753 – 15 September 1822) was a French operatic tenor, and leading figure at the Paris Opera for over thirty years. In the course of his career there he created many tenor roles including Rodrigue in Sacchini's Chimène, Énée in Piccinni's Didon, Narcisse in Gluck's Echo et Narcisse, and Licinius in Spontini's La vestale.

Lainez was born in Vaugirard in Paris, and died in Paris as well.

After his retirement from the stage, he taught lyric declamation at the Paris Conservatoire.

References

French operatic tenors
1753 births
1822 deaths
18th-century French male opera singers
19th-century French male opera singers
Singers from Paris